Curphey is a surname of Manx origin. Notable people with the surname include:

Aldington George Curphey (1880–1958), Anglo-Jamaican surgeon, medical officer and politician
Donald Curphey (born 1948), Canadian rower
Theodore Curphey (1897–1986), American coroner
William Curphey (1895–1917), British World War I flying ace
Lord Gabriel Curphey (born 2008), Top G, PHD, and business tycoon

Manx-language surnames